Postcards of the Hanging is a compilation album by the Grateful Dead. It consists entirely of Bob Dylan covers, performed live in concert, along with a rehearsal performance of "Man of Peace" featuring the Grateful Dead backing Dylan himself.  Bob Weir sings lead on five tracks, Jerry Garcia on three, and Phil Lesh on one ("Just Like Tom Thumb's Blues"); Weir and Garcia also alternate on one ("Maggie's Farm").  Another Dylan covers collection, Garcia Plays Dylan, includes several performances by the Grateful Dead, but mostly by the Jerry Garcia Band and other Garcia side projects.  An album of live performances containing Dylan and the Grateful Dead performing together was released in 1989 as "Dylan & the Dead."

The title comes from the opening stanza of Dylan's "Desolation Row": "They're selling postcards of the hanging/ They're painting the passports brown."

Content
Seven of the songs on the album originally appeared on the Dylan albums Bringing It All Back Home and Highway 61 Revisited; the remaining three represent Blonde on Blonde, John Wesley Harding, and the Leon Russell session that produced "Watching the River Flow" for the Greatest Hits II double-LP. Aside from being from among his most critically revered rock albums, the seven songs date from 1965, the year the long strange trip of the Grateful Dead began. The songs remained in the Dead's live rotation throughout their existence.

Conspicuously absent from the compilation is "Knockin' on Heaven's Door", a song the Dead performed more than 170 times. Conversely, "It Takes a Lot to Laugh, It Takes a Train to Cry" was performed a few times in the early 1990s, and only once in the 1970s – in the version included here, the Dead are accompanied by Dickey Betts and Butch Trucks, of the Allman Brothers Band. Dylan himself leads the band on the final track of the main disc, a rehearsal for the 1987 tour for which the Dead were his backing band.

Track listing
All songs written by Bob Dylan

Personnel 
 Jerry Garcia – lead guitar, vocals
 Bob Weir – rhythm guitar, vocals
 Phil Lesh – bass guitar, vocals
 Brent Mydland – keyboards, organ, vocals (except track 6)
 Mickey Hart – drums
 Bill Kreutzmann – drums
 Keith Godchaux – piano (track 6)

Additional personnel
 Dickey Betts – guitar (track 6)
 Bob Dylan – acoustic guitar, vocals (track 11)
 Butch Trucks – drums (track 6)

Production 
 John Cutler – engineer
 Bill Candelario – engineer
 Jeffrey Norman – mix
 David Gans – compilation producer
 David Lemieux – tape archivist
 Joe Gastwirt – mastering
 Geoff Gans – art direction
 Emily Burnham – illustration and design
 Cassidy Law – album coordination
 Ken Friedman – photography

Charts
Album – Billboard

See also
List of songs written by Bob Dylan
List of artists who have covered Bob Dylan songs

Notes

Grateful Dead live albums
2002 live albums
Arista Records live albums
Grateful Dead Records live albums
Bob Dylan tribute albums